Eric D. Lynch (born May 16, 1970) is a former American football running back in the National Football League who played for the Detroit Lions.  He played college football for the Grand Valley State Lakers.

He was inducted into Grand Valley States Hall of Fame.

References

1970 births
Living people
American football running backs
Detroit Lions players
Grand Valley State Lakers football players